Furkan Asena Aydın (born February 12, 1992) is a Turkish taekwondo practitioner competing in the middleweight division.

Furkan Asena Aydın won a bronze medal at the 2009 World Taekwondo Championships held in Copenhagen, Denmark. At the 2011 Summer Universiade in Shenzhen, China, she won the silver medal in the -67 kg division.

See also
 Turkish women in sports

References

1992 births
People from Kütahya
Turkish female taekwondo practitioners
Living people
Turkish female martial artists
European Games competitors for Turkey
Universiade medalists in taekwondo
Universiade silver medalists for Turkey
Universiade bronze medalists for Turkey
Taekwondo practitioners at the 2015 European Games
European Taekwondo Championships medalists
World Taekwondo Championships medalists
Medalists at the 2011 Summer Universiade
21st-century Turkish sportswomen